This is a list of Slovenian Roman Catholic Bishops.

List 

Slovenia
Catholic bishops